Belsize could refer to:
 Belsize Park – also known as 'Belsize' – a neighbourhood in London, the United Kingdom
 Belsize (ward), a ward named after Belsize Park, London
 Belsize, Hertfordshire, a hamlet in Hertfordshire
 Belsize architects, a firm of architects based in Belsize Park, London
 Belsize Motors, a former automobile-manufacturing firm based in Manchester